The 1887 Philadelphia mayoral election saw the election Edwin Henry Fitler. This was the first Philadelphia mayoral election to a 4-year term. Previously, since 1862, mayoral elections had been for three-year terms.

Results

References

1887
Philadelphia
Philadelphia mayoral
19th century in Philadelphia